Santiago de Wit Gúzman (born 5 September 1964) is a Spanish prelate of the Catholic Church who works in the diplomatic service of the Holy See.

Biography 
He was born in the city of Valencia on 5 September 1964. He was ordained a priest for the Archdiocese of Valencia on 27 May 1989.

After his ordination he obtained a bachelor's degree in theology from the Faculty of Theology San Vicente Ferrer of Valencia. He also earned a doctorate in Canon Law at the Pontifical University of St. Thomas Aquinas. He also studied at the Pontifical Ecclesiastical Academy from 1994 to 1998.

He entered the diplomatic service of the Holy See on 13 June 1998. He worked in the Central African Republic and Chad until 2001, then in the Netherlands until 2004, and then in Paraguay until 2007. From 2007 to 2010 he was a counselor in the Apostolic Nunciature in Egypt, then in the Democratic Republic of the Congo until 2012, and then in his native Spain.

In 21 March 2017, Pope Francis appointed him titular archbishop of Gabala and apostolic nuncio to the Central African Republic. On 25 March he was named nuncio to Chad as well. He received his episcopal consecration on 10 June from Archbishop Paul Richard Gallagher.

On 30 July 2022, Pope Francis appointed him as apostolic nuncio to Trinidad and Tobago, Antigua and Barbuda, Belize, Grenada, Guyana, Saint Kitts and Nevis, Saint Vincent and Grenadines, Suriname and apostolic delegate in the Antilles. On 12 November 2022, he was appointed nuncio to Bahamas, Barbados, Dominica, Jamaica and Saint Lucia as well.

See also
 List of heads of the diplomatic missions of the Holy See

References

External links 
 Catholic Hierarchy: Archbishop Santiago De Wit Guzmán 

1964 births
Living people
People from Valencia
Apostolic Nuncios to the Republic of the Congo
Apostolic Nuncios to Chad
Apostolic Nuncios to the Central African Republic
Apostolic Nuncios to Trinidad and Tobago
Apostolic Nuncios to Antigua and Barbuda
Apostolic Nuncios to Belize
Apostolic Nuncios to the Bahamas
Apostolic Nuncios to Barbados
Apostolic Nuncios to Dominica
Apostolic Nuncios to Jamaica
Apostolic Nuncios to Grenada
Apostolic Nuncios to Guyana
Apostolic Nuncios to Saint Kitts and Nevis
Apostolic Nuncios to Saint Lucia
Apostolic Nuncios to Suriname
Apostolic Nuncios to Saint Vincent and the Grenadines
Pontifical Ecclesiastical Academy alumni
Roman Catholic titular archbishops
Diplomats of the Holy See